Yaramış is a village in Tarsus district of Mersin Province, Turkey. It is situated in Çukurova (Cilicia of the antiquity) to the southeast of Tarsus and to the west of Berdan River. The population of Yaramış was 192 as of 2012.

References

Villages in Tarsus District